Lamo Angdang (also known as Lamaanden and Lamo Anden) is a mountain in the Eastern Himalayas, located to the West of Sikkim. Its elevation above sea level is 5,888m.

Location 
It is the eastern most summit of the Kangchenjunga group and it is officially the part of Khangchendzonga National Park. In 2007, it was opened for public as a new trekking route in North Sikkim district.

References 

Mountains of Sikkim